Guy Reese (September 22, 1939 – November 22, 2010) was a professional American football defensive tackle in the National Football League (NFL) for the Dallas Cowboys, Baltimore Colts and Atlanta Falcons. He played college football at Southern Methodist University.

Early years
Reese attended South Oak Cliff High School, where he played as a two-way tackle. He accepted a football scholarship from Southern Methodist University. He became a starter at right tackle as a junior.

Professional career

Dallas Cowboys
Reese was selected by the Dallas Cowboys in the fifteenth round (200th overall) of the 1962 NFL Draft and by the Dallas Texans in the eleventh round (83rd overall) of the 1962 AFL Draft. 

He opted to sign with the Cowboys and was tried at the offensive line. As a rookie, he was named the starter at left defensive tackle opposite John Meyers. He was part of a defensive line called the "Maverick Line", that had 3 rookies and a second-year player. He was named to the NFL All-Rookie team.

In 1963, he was the starter opposite future hall of famer Bob Lilly. On July 12, 1964, he was traded to the Baltimore Colts in exchange for defensive tackle Jim Colvin.

Baltimore Colts
In 1964, although he was limited with an ankle injury early in the season, he passed Billy Ray Smith Sr. on the depth chart. He started 12 out of 14 games at right defensive tackle, while playing alongside Fred Miller. 

In 1964, he was mainly a backup behind Smith Sr., starting 3 out of 13 games.

Atlanta Falcons
The Atlanta Falcons selected him from the Colts roster in the 1966 NFL Expansion Draft. He was named the starter at left defensive tackle in the franchise's inaugural season, but suffered a knee injury in the second game against the Philadelphia Eagles and was lost for the year. It turned out to be a career-ending injury that forced him to retire on May 17, 1967.

Personal life
Reese was a real estate appraiser for over 30 years. He died of cancer on November 22, 2010.

References

External links
Guy P. Reese Obituary

1939 births
2010 deaths
Players of American football from Dallas
American football defensive tackles
SMU Mustangs football players
Dallas Cowboys players
Baltimore Colts players
Atlanta Falcons players
Deaths from cancer in Texas